The Katja Riipi Award is an ice hockey trophy, seasonally awarded by the Finnish Ice Hockey Association to the best forward of the Naisten Liiga, previously the Naisten SM-sarja. Best forward in the Naisten Liiga was first awarded in the 2005–06 season, to Saara Niemi. The award was named in honor of Katja Riipi during the 2010–11 season.  

The most Katja Riipi Awards won by a single player is four, a record held by two iconic players of the 2010s: Linda Leppänen and Elisa Holopainen. Leppänen, a centre, first won the trophy in the 2009–10 season, while playing with Ilves Tampere – the team she would later coach during 2020 to 2022. Her later three titles were awarded while playing with the Kiekko-Espoo franchise, winning consecutive trophies in the 2013–14 season and 2014–15 seasons, when the team was called the Espoo Blues, and in the 2016–17 season, when the team was called Espoo United. Young phenom Elisa Holopainen, a left winger, is the current title holder and has won the award in each of the past four seasons, making her the first player to win the award more than two consecutive times. Anne Helin, who won the trophy in the 2010–11 season and 2012–13, is the only other player to have been awarded the Katja Riipi Award more than once.

Award winners 

Source: Elite Prospects

All-time award recipients

References

Naisten Liiga (ice hockey) trophies and awards